George Thorn (1838–1905), son of George Thorn (senior), was Premier of Queensland, Australia.

George Thorn may also refer to:

 George Thorn (senior) (1806-1876), politician in Queensland, Australia; father of George Thorn
 George W. Thorn (1906–2004), American physician
George Thorn (songwriter), see Spanish Harlem (album)

See also
George Thorne (disambiguation)
Georges Thorn, see List of presidents of the Council of State of Luxembourg